Treeing is a method of hunting where dogs are used to force animals that naturally climb up into trees, where they can be assessed or shot by hunters. The idiomatic phrase "Barking up the wrong tree" comes from this practice.

Description 
The treeing technique uses dogs to force naturally climbing animals into trees, where they can be assessed or shot by hunters. Treeing enables hunters to see the quarry and decide if the prey should be killed, and if so with a cleaner kill, or spared. For example, females with youths may be left untouched, or quarry may be observed or tagged for research.

Use

Hunting 
Particularly used with coonhunting, treeing dogs are selected for the instinct to not cease barking at an animal after it has escaped into a tree. This method of hunting is also used for cougar and black bear.

The dogs are trained to bay, not directly attack the quarry; however, it is not unheard of for the quarry to kill some of the dogs or for the dogs to kill the quarry. Usually, the quarry will climb a tree to escape the dogs after a period of chase and harassment. Blackmouth Cur use this method. Traditionally, the dogs were followed on foot by hunters listening to their barks, although some hunters now use radio direction finding equipment to follow the pack.

Research 
Treeing is also sometimes performed without the intention of killing the quarry for scientific purposes (such as radio-tagging) or recreational purposes. It is especially useful for cougars, which are notoriously stealthy and difficult to capture without the aid of dogs.

Law 

Treeing is illegal in several US states, including: 
 Oregon
 Washington State
 New Mexico
 Montana
 California, since January 1st 2013, Governor Jerry Brown signed a bill banning hunting of bears, bobcats with hound.
Natural spaces law enforcement officers urged hunters or outdoor enthusiasts to call police and report any suspicious activity they witness.

References

See also 

Hunting dogs

Hunting methods
Dog training and behavior